Personality Disorders: Theory, Research, and Treatment is a peer-reviewed academic journal published by the American Psychological Association. It was established in 2009 and covers research in personality psychology. The current editor-in-chief is Joshua D. Miller, PhD.

Abstracting and indexing 
The journal is abstracted and indexed in the Social Sciences Citation Index. According to the Journal Citation Reports, the journal has a 2020 impact factor of 3.623.

References

External links 
 

American Psychological Association academic journals
English-language journals
2009 establishments in the United States
Publications established in 2009